Folsom High School is a public secondary school in the western United States, located in Folsom, California, a suburb east of Sacramento. Established  in 1922, it is a part of the Folsom Cordova Unified School District.

School history
The first campus constructed for Folsom High School was at 715 Riley Street. (The current home of Sutter Middle School.) Before Folsom High existed, students in Folsom attended San Juan High School on Greenback Lane in Citrus Heights.  A major fire on June 22, 1959 destroyed most of the original buildings on the Folsom High School campus on Riley Street.  The new Folsom High campus on Iron Point Road opened in August of 1998 for Junior and senior students only.  Freshman and sophomore students remained at the old Riley Street campus until the second phase of the construction of the new campus was completed in 2000.

Demographics

Athletics
In 2006 and 2008, the varsity cheerleading squad took second place in the Universal Cheerleading Association's high school national championship, runner-up to Colleyville Heritage of Texas in 2006 and Paul Laurence Dunbar of Kentucky in 2008.

In 2010, the football team defeated Gardena 48-20 for the CIF Division II state championship. The team was led by future NFL safety Jordan Richards and star quarterback Dano Graves. Graves was named the MaxPreps National Player of the Year in 2010.

In 2013, FHS quarterback Jake Browning was named the state Gatorade Player of the Year. He led the Bulldogs to another section championship and the California Interscholastic Federation (CIF) Northern California regional championship game, but fell to De La Salle of Concord.

In 2014, the football team defeated Oceanside 68–7 for the CIF Division I state championship, their second state title in four years. The Team went undefeated for the season (16-0). The Bulldogs finished fourth in the nation on the Xcellent 25, presented by the Army National Guard.

In 2017, the football team defeated Helix High School 49-42 for the CIF Division I state championship. The team went undefeated (16-0) for the year.

In 2018, the football team defeated Cathedral Catholic High School 21-14 to repeat as CIF Division I state champions, the fourth state title in 9 years.

Notable alumni
 John Briggs, former professional baseball player (Chicago Cubs, Cleveland Indians, Kansas City Athletics)
 Mike Cather, former professional baseball player (Atlanta Braves)
Joseph James DeAngelo, Serial Killer, Rapist and Burglar.
Josiah Deguara, tight end for the Green Bay Packers
 John Jones, a professional soccer player
 Spider Jorgensen, former Major League Baseball player (Brooklyn Dodgers, New York Giants)
 Ryan Rau, former linebacker for the Miami Dolphins 
 Virgil Carter, former professional football quarterback (Cleveland Browns, Cincinnati Bengals)
 Jordan Richards, safety for the Baltimore Ravens
Jake Browning, quarterback for the Minnesota Vikings
Jonah Williams, offensive tackle for the Cincinnati Bengals
Mara Davi, Broadway actress and dancer

References

External links

Official website
 

Folsom, California
Public high schools in California
High schools in Sacramento County, California
1922 establishments in California